Fish Creek (also known as Fish or Fish Creek Station) is an unincorporated community in Polk County, Georgia, United States.

History
A post office was established as Fish in 1874, and remained in operation until it was discontinued in 1934. The community took its name from nearby Fish Creek.

References

Unincorporated communities in Polk County, Georgia
Unincorporated communities in Georgia (U.S. state)